Fatehpur, Haryana may refer to:

 Fatehpur, Kaithal, a panchayat village in Kaithal district
 Fatehpur, Yamunanagar, a village and gram panchayat in Yamunanagar district